Two Fathers is a 2013 Taiwanese television series created and developed by SETTV and Sensual Workshop Ltd. It stars Weber Yang, Lin You-wei, Megan Lai, Marcus Zhang, Amanda Chou and Le Le as the main cast for the drama series. The drama debuted on 26 March 2013, replacing Lady Maid Maids time slot on SETTV's 8 p.m. drama lineup.

Cast

Main cast

Supporting Cast
 Chang Kuo-chu (張國柱) as Tang, Yao-qun 唐耀群 - the lawyer's father
 Liao Chun (廖峻) as Fāng, Da-tong 方大銅 - the teacher's father
 Steven Sun (孫其君) as Fāng, Qing-zhu 方慶竹 - the teacher's brother studying in america
 Cheng Hsiu-ying (程秀瑛) as Chen, Guo-xiang 陳國香 - the teacher's mother
 Ada Pan (潘慧如) as Su, Wen-wen 蘇文汶 - Wendi's mom
 Que Xiao-you (闕小佑) as Ceng, Zheng-xiong 曾正雄 - Wen-di’s classmate and boy friend
 Chang Ting-yi (張庭宜) as Xu, Yu-wei 徐育薇 - Wen-di’s classmate and girl friend
 Liao Chin-de (廖錦德) as Ni-ou 尼歐 - mechanic, NBA (american basketball) fan
 Lara Chen (陳子玄) as Lín, Yu-fang 林育芳 - assistant at flower shop
 Lai Pei-ying (賴佩瑩) as Ceng-wu, Mei-nu 曾吳美女 - Zheng-xiong's mom
 Jane Liao (廖慧珍) as Jia, Mei-nu 賈美女 - flower shop customer in love with Zhen-hua
 Vanila Song (宋妍甄) as Xiao-pei 小佩 - female law firm employee
 Cai Shun-chieh (蔡順傑) as Cai, A-can 蔡阿燦 - male law firm employee
 Ting-Yu Kao as Zhao Ting Yu - gym teacher

Opening theme
 You-wei Lin – "Happy Voice" (幸福的聲音)

Ending theme
 Rene Liu – "Happiness Is Not a Love Song" (幸福不是情歌)

Insert songs
 Megan Lai – "If There Was Not You" (如果沒有你)
 Magic Power MP魔幻力量 – "Forgotten How to Love You" (忘了怎麼愛你)
 Magic Power MP魔幻力量 – "Photosynthesis" (光合作用)
 Yen-j Mayday – "Cleanliness" (潔癖)

Broadcast

External links
SETTV Official site

Eastern Television original programming
Sanlih E-Television original programming
2013 Taiwanese television series debuts
2013 Taiwanese television series endings
Parenting television series